This is a list of artists whose records appeared on the His Master's Voice label, with the POP number prefix.

The Ames Brothers
Louis Armstrong
Eddy Arnold
Frankie Avalon
The Blue-Belles
Bernard Bresslaw
Al Caiola
Ray Charles
Alma Cogan
Jerry Colonna
Perry Como
Danny and the Juniors
Dion
Fabian
Ferrante and Teicher
Eddie Fisher
Ella Fitzgerald
Eydie Gorme
The Highwaymen
The Impressions
Spike Jones
Johnny Kidd and the Pirates
Eartha Kitt
Julius LaRosa
Steve Lawrence
John Leyton
Hank Levine ("Image")
Manfred Mann
Johnny Mathis
Mickey & Sylvia
Jaye P. Morgan
Morrissey
The Olympics
Gene Pitney
Perez Prado
Elvis Presley
Lloyd Price
Tommy Roe
Soupy Sales
Dinah Shore
Jimmy Smith
Kay Starr
The Swinging Blue Jeans
Philip Upchurch Combo
Danny Williams
Hugo Winterhalter

External links
HMV singles discography including POP series

EMI